Karu may refer to:

 Places
 Karu, Estonia
 Karu LGA, Nigeria
 Karu Urban Area
 Karu Nadu, South West India
 Karu, Ladakh, North India

 Languages
 Karu language

 People
 Erkki Karu (1887–1935), Finnish film director, screenwriter and producer
 Esko Karu (1946–2003), Canadian skier
 Peeter Karu (1909–1942), Estonian sport shooter
 Karu Jain, Indian cricketer

 Media
 Karu (film), a Tamil film directed by A. L. Vijay
 Karu süda (The Heart of the Bear), a 2001 Estonian film
 "Karu", a song by Sentenced from The Funeral Album

See also
 Käru (disambiguation)

Surnames from nicknames